Jovan Krneta (Serbian Cyrillic: Јован Крнета; born 4 May 1992) is a Serbian footballer who plays for FK Inđija.

Career
Jovan began his career with Partizan youth squad. Few times he was even included in their first team, but never managed to make a debut for them. In January 2011, after his contract with Partizan expired, he signed for their arch rivals Red Star Belgrade. However, he was loaned to the Sopot where he spent almost a year. In January 2012 he was promoted to Red Star's first squad, and on 14 March 2012 he made his first team debut in a match against Smederevo.

In July 2015, Krneta signed a one-year contract with Azerbaijan Premier League side Zira FK.

Career statistics

Honours
Red Star
Serbian SuperLiga (1): 2013–14
Serbian Cup (1): 2011–12

References

External links
 Story on Partizan's official site
 

1992 births
Living people
Footballers from Belgrade
Association football defenders
Serbian footballers
Serbian expatriate footballers
Serbia youth international footballers
FK Partizan players
FK Teleoptik players
Red Star Belgrade footballers
FK Radnički 1923 players
Serbian SuperLiga players
FC Chornomorets Odesa players
Zira FK players
Levadiakos F.C. players
Ukrainian Premier League players
Azerbaijan Premier League players
Expatriate footballers in Ukraine
Serbian expatriate sportspeople in Ukraine
Expatriate footballers in Azerbaijan
Serbian expatriate sportspeople in Azerbaijan
Expatriate footballers in Greece